Fitzcarraldo is a 1982 West German epic adventure-drama film written, produced and directed by Werner Herzog, and starring Klaus Kinski as would-be rubber baron, Brian Sweeney Fitzgerald, an Irishman known in Peru as Fitzcarraldo, who is determined to transport a steamship over a steep hill to access a rich rubber territory in the Amazon Basin. The film is derived from the historic events of Peruvian rubber baron Carlos Fitzcarrald and his real-life feat of transporting a disassembled steamboat over the Isthmus of Fitzcarrald.

The film had a troubled production, chronicled in the documentary Burden of Dreams. Herzog had his crew attempt to manually haul the 320-ton steamship up a steep hill, leading to three injuries. The film's original star Jason Robards became sick halfway through filming, so Herzog hired Kinski, with whom he had previously clashed violently during production of Aguirre, the Wrath of God, Nosferatu the Vampyre and Woyzeck. Their fourth partnership fared no better. When shooting was nearly complete, the chief of the Machiguenga tribe who were used extensively as extras, asked Herzog if they should kill Kinski for him. Herzog declined.

Plot
Brian Sweeney "Fitzcarraldo" Fitzgerald is an Irishman living in Iquitos, a small city east of the Andes in the Amazon Basin in Peru in the early part of the 20th century, when the city grew exponentially during the rubber boom. He has an indomitable spirit, but is little more than a dreamer with one major failure already behind him – the bankrupted and incomplete Trans-Andean railways. A lover of opera and a great fan of the internationally known Italian tenor Enrico Caruso, he dreams of building an opera house in Iquitos.

Numerous Europeans and North African Sephardic Jewish immigrants have settled in the city at this time, bringing their cultures with them. The opera house will require considerable amounts of money, which the booming rubber industry in Peru should yield in profits. The areas in the Amazon Basin known to contain rubber trees have been parceled up by the Peruvian government and are leased to private companies for exploitation.

Fitzcarraldo explores entering the rubber business. A helpful rubber baron points out on a map the only remaining unclaimed parcel in the area. He explains that while it is located on the Ucayali River, a major tributary of the Amazon, it is cut off from the Amazon (and access to Atlantic ports) by a lengthy section of rapids. Fitzcarraldo sees that the Pachitea River, another Amazon tributary, comes within several hundred meters of the Ucayali upstream of the parcel. He plans to investigate that.

He leases the inaccessible parcel from the government. His paramour, Molly, a successful brothel owner, funds his purchase of an old steamship (which he christens the SS Molly Aida). After recruiting a crew, he takes off up the Pachitea, the parallel river. This river has dangerous interior areas because of its indigenous people hostile to outsiders.

Fitzcarraldo plans to go to the closest point between the two rivers and, with the manpower of impressed natives (who are nearly enslaved by many rubber companies), physically pull his three-deck, 320-ton steamer over the muddy 40° hillside across a portage from one river to the next. Using the steamer, he will collect rubber produced on the upper Ucayali and bring it down the Pachitea and the Amazon to market at Atlantic ports.

The majority of the ship's crew, at first unaware of Fitzcarraldo's plan, abandon the expedition soon after entering indigenous territory, leaving only the captain, engineer, and cook. Impressed by Fitzcarraldo and his ship, the natives start working for him without fully understanding his goals. After great struggles, they successfully pull the ship over the mountain with a complex system of pulleys, worked by the natives and aided by the ship's anchor windlass. When the crew falls asleep after a drunken celebration, the chief of the natives severs the rope securing the ship to the shore. It floats down the river. The chief wanted to appease the river gods, who would otherwise be angered that Fitzcarraldo defied nature by circumventing them.

Though the ship traverses the Ucayali rapids without major damage, Fitzcarraldo and his crew are forced to return to Iquitos without any rubber. Despondent, Fitzcarraldo sells the ship back to the rubber baron, but first sends the captain on a last voyage. He returns with the entire cast for the first opera production, including Caruso. The entire city of Iquitos comes to the shore as Fitzcarraldo, standing on top of the ship, proudly displays the cast.

Cast

Production

The story was inspired by the historical figure of Peruvian rubber baron Carlos Fermín Fitzcarrald. In the 1890s, Fitzcarrald arranged for the transport of a steamship across an isthmus from one river into another, but it weighed only 30 tons (rather than over 300), and was carried over in pieces to be reassembled at its destination.

In his autobiographical film Portrait Werner Herzog, Herzog said that he concentrated in Fitzcarraldo on the physical effort of transporting the ship, partly inspired by the engineering feats of ancient standing stones. The film production was an incredible ordeal, and famously involved moving a 320-ton steamship over a hill. This was filmed without the use of special effects. Herzog believed that no one had ever performed a similar feat in history, and likely never will again, calling himself "Conquistador of the Useless". Three similar-looking ships were bought for the production and used in different scenes and locations, including scenes that were shot aboard the ship while it crashed through rapids. The most violent scenes in the rapids were shot with a model of the ship.  Three of the six people involved in the filming were injured during this passage.

Casting of the film was difficult. Jason Robards was originally cast in the title role, but he became ill with dysentery during early filming. After leaving for treatment, he was forbidden by his doctors to return. Herzog considered casting Jack Nicholson, or playing the role of Fitzcarraldo himself, before Klaus Kinski accepted the role. Herzog had done considerable film work with Kinski. By that point, forty percent of shooting with Robards was complete. For continuity, Herzog had to begin a total reshoot with Kinski. Mick Jagger as Fitzcarraldo's assistant Wilbur and Mario Adorf as the Ship's captain were originally cast, but due to the delays, their shooting schedule expired. Jagger parted to tour with the Rolling Stones. Herzog dropped Jagger's character from the script altogether as he reshot the film from the beginning.

Kinski displayed erratic behavior throughout the production and fought virulently with Herzog and other members of the crew. A scene from Herzog's documentary of the actor, My Best Fiend, shows Kinski raging at production manager Walter Saxer over trivial matters, such as the quality of the food. Herzog notes that the native extras were greatly upset by the actor's behavior. Kinski claimed to feel close to them. In My Best Fiend, Herzog says that one of the native chiefs offered in all seriousness to kill Kinski for him, but that he declined because he needed the actor to complete filming. According to Herzog, he exploited these tensions: in a scene in which the ship's crew is eating dinner while surrounded by the natives, the clamor the chief incites over Fitzcarraldo was inspired by their hatred of Kinski.

Locations used for the film include: Manaus, Brazil; Iquitos, Peru; Pongo de Mainique, Peru; an isthmus between the Urubamba and the Camisea rivers, Peru at -11.737294,-72.934542, 36 miles west of the actual historical fiction, the Isthmus of Fitzcarrald.

Herzog's first version of the story was published as Fitzcarraldo: The Original Story (1982) from Fjord Press. He made alterations while writing the screenplay.

Deaths, injuries and accusations of exploitation
The production was also affected by the numerous injuries and deaths of several indigenous extras who were hired to work on the film as laborers, and two small plane crashes that occurred during the film's production which resulted in a number of injuries, including one case of paralysis. Another incident during the production included a local Peruvian logger who was bitten by a venomous snake, who made the dramatic decision to cut off his own foot with a chainsaw to prevent the spread of the venom, thus saving his own life.

Herzog has been accused of exploiting indigenous people in the making of the film and comparisons have been made between Herzog and Fitzcarrald himself. In 1982 Michael F. Brown, now a professor of anthropology at Williams College, claimed in the magazine The Progressive that while Herzog originally got along with the Aguaruna people, some of whom were hired as extras for the film and for construction, relations deteriorated when Herzog began the construction of a village on Aguaruna land. He allegedly failed to consult the tribal council and attempted to obtain protection from the local militia when the tribe turned violent. Aguaruna men burned down the film set in December 1979, reportedly careful to avoid casualties.

Music
The soundtrack album (released in 1982) contains music by Popol Vuh, taken from the albums Die Nacht der Seele (1979) and Sei still, wisse ich bin (1981), performances by Enrico Caruso, and others. The film uses excerpts from the operas: Verdi's Ernani, Leoncavallo's Pagliacci ("Ridi, Pagliaccio"), Puccini's La bohème, Bellini's I puritani, and from Richard Strauss' orchestral work Death and Transfiguration.

Reception

The film holds a 77% Fresh rating on the movie aggregate Rotten Tomatoes based on 30 reviews, with an average rating of 7.5 out of 10. The movie critic Roger Ebert gave the movie four stars in his original 1982 review; he added it to his "Great Movie" collection in 2005. Ebert compared it to films like Apocalypse Now and 2001: A Space Odyssey, noting that "we are always aware both of the film, and of the making of the film" and concluding that "[t]he movie is imperfect, but transcendent".

The Japanese filmmaker Akira Kurosawa cited Fitzcarraldo as one of his favorite films.

Awards
The film won the German Film Prize in Silver for Best Feature Film. The film was nominated for the BAFTA Award for Best Foreign Film, the Palme d'Or award of the Cannes Film Festival, and the Golden Globe Award for Best Foreign Language Film. Herzog won the award for Best Director at the 1982 Cannes Film Festival. The film was selected as the West German entry for the Best Foreign Language Film at the 55th Academy Awards, but did not make the shortlist of nominees.

Related works
Les Blank's documentary Burden of Dreams (1982), filmed during the production of this drama, documents its many hardships. Blank's work contains some of the only surviving footage of Robards' and Jagger's performances in the early filming of Fitzcarraldo. Herzog later used portions of this work in his documentaries: Portrait Werner Herzog (1986) and My Best Fiend (1999). Burden of Dreams has many scenes documenting the arduous transport of the ship over the mountain.

Herzog's personal diaries from the production were published in 2009 as the book Conquest of the Useless by Ecco Press. The book includes an epilogue with Herzog's views on the Peruvian jungle 20 years later.

Representation in other media
In her 1983 parody "From the Diary of Werner Herzog" in The Boston Phoenix, Cathleen Schine describes the history of a fictitious film, Fritz: Commuter, as "a nightmarish tale of a German businessman obsessed with bringing professional hockey to Westport, Connecticut".

Glen Hansard wrote a song entitled "Fitzcarraldo", which appears on The Frames' 1995 album of the same name. On their live album Set List, Hansard says that Herzog's film inspired this song.

The film was referred to in the Simpsons episode "On a Clear Day I Can't See My Sister", in which the students are forced to pull the bus up a mountain. Üter complains, "I feel like I'm 'Fitzcarraldo'!" Nelson replies "That movie was flawed!", punching Üter in the stomach. A later episode's title, "Fatzcarraldo", referenced the title of the film and parodied aspects of it as well.

See also
 List of submissions to the 55th Academy Awards for Best Foreign Language Film
 List of German submissions for the Academy Award for Best Foreign Language Film
Carlos Fitzcarrald
Isthmus of Fitzcarrald

References

External links
 
 
 Fitzcarraldo at filmportal.de/en

1982 films
1980s adventure drama films
German adventure drama films
German epic films
Seafaring films
Films shot in Manaus
Films shot in Peru
Films set in Brazil
Films set in Peru
Films set in the 1890s
1980s German-language films
West German films
Films directed by Werner Herzog
Films scored by Popol Vuh (band)
Films set in jungles
1982 drama films
1980s German films